This is a list of military equipment of Germany's allies on the Balkan and Russian fronts (1941–1945). Other weapons were used for training or national defense purposes in capitals and main cities.

This article presents a comprehensive list of equipment, including Western, Italian, and German weapons, in operational use on the Russian and Yugoslav fronts by pro-Axis countries received from these states. It also includes Russian armaments and certain Western equipment in use against Soviets at the Eastern Front.

Finland

Aircraft
VL Sääski I, II, III
VL Kotka I, II
VL Tuisku I, II
VL Viima I, II
VL Pyry I, II
VL Myrsky I, II, III
VL Pyörremyrsky
VL Humu
Arado Ar 196A-3
Dornier Do 17Z-1
Dornier Do 17Z-2
Dornier Do 17Z-3
Dornier Do 22Kl
Fieseler Fi 156C Storch
Focke-Wulf Fw 44C Stieglitz
Focke-Wulf Fw 58C Weihe
Heinkel He 115A-2
Junkers F 13
Junkers W 34
Junkers K 43
Junkers Ju 88A-4
Messerschmitt Me/Bf 109G-2
Messerschmitt Me/Bf 109G-6
Messerschmitt Me/Bf 109G-8
Aero A.32
Letov Š-328
Curtiss P-36A (Mohawk 75A)
Curtiss P-40N-20 Warhawk
Brewster F2A-1 (Mk.B-293) "Buffalo"
Douglas DC-2 (C-32A) "Hanssin-Jukka"
De Havilland Gypsy Moth
De Havilland D.H. 86B
Cessna UC-77C
Fairchild UC-61K Forwarder
Caudron C.714 C1 "Cyclone"
Morane-Saulnier M.S.406 C1
Morane-Saulnier M.S.410 C1
Local M.S. 406/410 derivation "Mörkö-Morane"
Hanriot H.232
Avro 652A Anson Mk.1
Blackburn Ripon IIF
Bristol Bulldog Mk.II
Bristol Bulldog Mk.IV A
Bristol Blenheim Mk.I
Bristol Blenheim Mk.IV
Gloster Gauntlet Mk.II
Gloster Gladiator Mk.II
Hawker Hurricane Mk.I
Hawker Hurricane Mk.IIc
Fokker C.V.-D
Fokker F.VIIa
Fokker F.VIII
Fokker C.X.
Fokker D.XXI
Koolhoven F.K.41
Koolhoven F.K.52
Fiat G.50bis
Marinens Flyvebaatfabrikk M.F.11
Svenska Aero Jaktfalken
Beriev MBR-2
Ilyushin DB-3F (Il-4)
Lavochkin LaGG-3
Petlyakov Pe-2
Polikarpov U-2VS (Po-2)
Polikarpov I-15biss (I-152)
Polikarpov I-153
Polikarpov I-16 Type 24
Shavrov Sh-2
Tupolev SB
Tupolev SB-bis
Polikarpov I-16 UTI-4

Armoured vehicles 
Renault FT
Peerless armoured car
Vickers 6-Ton
Vickers-Armstrong Mk IV
BA-3 Armored Car
BA-6 Armored Car
BA-10 Armored Car
BA-20 Armored Car
BA-20M Armored Car
D-8 Armored Car
FAI Armored Car
FAI-M Armored Car
Komsomolets Tractor
T-26 (T26 Model 1931, T26 Model 1933, T-26 Model 1937, T26 model 1939, T26E, T26T, OT26)
OT-64
OT-130
T-27
T-28
T-33
T-34-76 Models 1941/42/43
T-34-85
T-37 (T-37A)
T-38 (T-38M2) (T-38-34 & T-38-KV were T-38s similar to T-34 and KV tanks, a Finnish conversion for anti-tank training)
T-40
T-50
BT-5
BT-7 Models 1935,37
KV-1 Models 1941,42
StuG III Ausf. G (7.5 cm Sturmgeschutz 40 Ausf G Sd Kfz 142/1)
Landsverk Anti II AA tank (40 ItK38)
Landsverk 182 Armoured Car
PzKpfw IV Ausf. J
BT-42

Artillery 
7.5 cm Pak 40
5 cm Pak 38
Bofors 37 mm
25 mm Hotchkiss anti-tank gun
76 mm regimental gun M1927
76 mm divisional gun M1902
76 mm divisional gun M1902/30
Canon de 105 mle 1913 Schneider
152 mm howitzer M1938 (M-10)
Canon de 155 C modèle 1917 Schneider

Italy
Main page: Italian Army equipment in World War II
There is only a reference to some aircraft in use in Africa, Eastern Front and other French and German aircraft received in the Italian Social Republic period; the armor and tanks were used in the Africa, Balkan and Italian areas.

Aircraft
Hawker Hurricane Mk.I (Captured example from Balkan campaign)
Bristol Beaufighter IF (Captured example from desert campaign)
Breda Ba.201 "Pichiatelli"
CANT Z.1007bis Alcione
Caproni Ca.133
Caproni Ca.310 Libeccio
Fiat CR.32
Macchi MC.200 Saetta
Macchi MC.202 Folgore
Savoia-Marchetti SM.79 Sparviero
Savoia-Marchetti SM.81 Pipistrello
Breguet 693 AB2
Dewoitine D.520
Lioret-et-Olivier LeO 451 B4
Junkers Ju 87 B-2 "Bertha"
Junkers Ju 87 B-2 Trop."Bertha"
Junkers Ju 87 D-1 "Dora"
Fieseler Fi 156 Storch
Junkers Ju 52/3m g7e
Junkers Ju 88A-4
Messerschmitt Me Bf 110C-4
Messerschmitt Me Bf 110G-4
Messerschmitt Me Bf 109G-6
Messerschmitt Me Bf 109G-10
Messerschmitt Me Bf 109G-12
Messerschmitt Me Bf 109K-4
Dornier Do 217J-2

Armoured vehicles 
Autoblindo Lancia I.Z.
Morris CS9 Armored car
Autoblindo Fiat 611
Autoblindo AB 40
Autoblindo AB 41
Autoblindo AB 43
Autoblindo Lince
Camionetta 42 Sahariana AS 42
Semincingolato Breda Tipo 61
Semicingolato Fiat 727
Carro d'assalto Fiat 3000 - Model 1921/1930
Carro Veloce 29
Carro Veloce L.3, CV.33, CV.35 L.3/35Lf
Carro Armato L.6/40, L.6/Lf, Centro Radio
Carro Armato M.11/39
Carro Armato M 13/40
Carro Armato M 14/41
Carro Armato M 15/42
Renault R-35
Somua S-35
PzKpfw III Ausf N
PzKpfw IV Ausf H
PzKpfw VI Tigers
StuG III Ausf G
T-34/76mm (Only on eastern front)
Semovente L40 da 47/32
Semovente M40 da 75/18, M41 da 75/18, M42 da 75/18
Carro Commando Per Reparto Semovente da 75/18
Semovente M 42M da 75/34
Semovente M 42L da 105/25
Autocannoni da 75
Breda Dovunque 90/53
Breda Autocannone Blindato Tipo 102
Autocannone da 90 - Lancia 3 RO Chassis

Artillery

Slovakia

Aircraft
Fieseler Fi 156 Storch
Focke-Wulf Fw 44 Stieglitz
Focke-Wulf Fw 58 Weihe
Focke-Wulf Fw 189 Uhu A-1
Gotha Go 145
Heinkel He 72B-1 Kadett
Heinkel He 111 H-3
Junkers W 34h
Junkers Ju 52/3m g7e
Junkers Ju 87
Klemm Kl 35D
Messerschmitt Me/Bf 109E-7
Messerschmitt Me/Bf 109G-6
Siebel Si 204A
Avia B-534.IV
Avia B 71
Aero A.100
Letov Š-328
Caudron C.445 Goeland
Savoia-Marchetti SM.84bis

Armoured vehicles 
Škoda OA vz.27 Armoured car
Tatra OA vz.30 Armoured car
ČKD Praga T-33 tankette (Tančik vz. 33)
ČKD Praga LT vz.34
Škoda LT vz.35
ČKD Praga THNPS1 aka LT vz.38/BMM PzKpfw 38(t) Ausf. A,G,S
ČKD Praga LLT (LT vz.40)
Panzerjaeger 38(t) fuer 7.62 cm PaK36(r) Sd.Kfz. 139 (Marder III)
Panzerkampfwagen II Ausf c, A, B und C Sd.Kfz. 121 (Panzer IIc)
Panzerkampfwagen III Ausf N Sd.Kfz. 141/2 (Panzer III N)
Škoda MTH (Leichter Raupenschlepper MTH)
ČKD Praga III (Leichter Raupenschlepper T-III (t))
ČKD Praga IV (Mittlerer Raupenschlepper T-IV (t))
ČKD Praga TH (Praga T 6)
ČKD Praga T9 (Praga TH 6)

Artillery

Hungary

Aircraft
Manfred Weiss WM 16 Budapest I/II
Manfred Weiss WM 21 Solyom
Repülőgépgyár Levente II
D.A.F. Me 210C-1/Ca-1 (Messerschmitt Me 210C under license)
Magyar Állami Vaggon és Gépgyár MÁVAG 109G-2,6,14 (Me/Bf 109 under license)
Magyar Állami Vaggon és Gépgyár MÁVAG Heja I/II (Caproni-Reggiane Re 2000 under license)
PIRT 52 (Junkers Ju 52 under license)
Arado Ar 79
Arado Ar 96B-5
Dornier Do 215B-4
Fieseler Fi 156C-2 Storch
Focke-Wulf Fw 56 Stosser
Focke-Wulf Fw 58C Weihe
Focke-Wulf Fw 189A-0 Uhu
Focke-Wulf Fw 190 F-3 Wurger
Heinkel He 45C
Heinkel He 46C-1
Heinkel He 111 H
Heinkel He 111 P-6
Heinkel He 112B-1
Heinkel He 170A
Junkers Ju 52/3m g7e
Junkers Ju 86 K-2
Junkers Ju 87B-2 Bertha
Junkers Ju 87D-1 Dora
Junkers Ju 87D-5 Dora
Junkers Ju 88A-4
Junkers Ju 88D-1
Klemm L 25D
Klemm Kl 31
Klemm Kl 35D
Messerschmitt Me/Bf 108B Taifun
Messerschmitt Me/Bf 109D-1
Messerschmitt Me/Bf 109F-4
Messerschmitt Me/Bf 109G-2
Messerschmitt Me/Bf 109G-4
Messerschmitt Me/Bf 110G-4
Siebel Si 202 Hummel
Avia B-534.IV.
Potez 63.11
Fokker C.V.-D
Fokker D.XVII
Breda Ba 65
Caproni Ca.101
Caproni Ca.135 P.XI. (Ca.135bis)
Caproni Ca.310 Libeccio
Caproni-Reggiane Re.2000 Serie I Falco I
Fiat CR.20
Fiat CR.20bis
Fiat CR.30
Fiat C.R.32bis
Fiat C.R.42AS Falco
Fiat G.12T
Meridionali Ro.37bis
Nardi F.N.305
Savoia-Marchetti SM.75 Marsupiale

Armoured vehicles 
Armoured car Tatra Koprivnice T-72 (OA vz.30)
BT Tanks (Captured From Soviet)
39M Csaba Scout Car
Skoda S-II-c (T-21)
Turán I, II, III (Skoda T-22)
40/43M Zrínyi II Assault Gun
38M Toldi I, II, III Tank (Landsverk L-60)
Antiaircraft Tank 40M Nimrod (40M Nimrod legvedelmi harckocsi) (Landsverk L-62 (Anti II) SPAAA)
LT vz.35
PzKpfw 38(t)
PzKpfw III and IV (D, F-1, F-2, G)
StuG III Ausf. G 7.5 cm Sturmgeschutz 40 Ausf G Sd Kfz 142/1
PzKpfw I
Ansaldo CV33
Gerat 555, Pz Jag Wg 638/10, Pz Jag 38(t) (Hetzer)
Jagdpanzer 38(t) Hetzer (Panzerjager 38(t)) for 7.5 cm PaK39
Panzer PzKpfw VI Tiger 1 (retained German Markings)
American M3 Stuart Light Tank (captured on the eastern front)
T-34/76 (captured on Eastern Front)
T-27 Soviet Tank (captured on Eastern Front)
BA-20 Soviet Armored Car (captured on Eastern Front)

Artillery 
80 mm 5/8M field gun
100 mm 14/a. M field howitzer
105 mm 37M light howitzer
37 mm 36M anti-tank cannon
7.5 cm PaK 40
40 mm 36M Bofors anti-aircraft cannon
Bofors 80 mm

Romania

Aircraft
Interprindere Pentru Contrucţii Aeronautice Române ICAR 36 (prototype, with Messerschmitt license)
Industria Aeronautică Română IAR 36 (definitive design)
IAR 37
IAR 38
IAR 39
IAR 79
IAR 80
IAR 80A
IAR 81
IAR 81A
IAR 81B
IAR 81C
SET 7
Lublin R-XIIID
PWS-26
PZL P.7a
PZL P.11 B, C, F ( F version built under licence at I.A.R.)
PZL.23 Karaś B
PZL P.24F (version built under licence at I.A.R.)
PZL.37 Łoś A and B variants
RWD-8
RWD-13
RWD-14 Czapla
Avia BH-25J
Arado Ar 96B-5
Arado Ar 196A-3 (delivery unconfirmed)
Bücker Bü 131B Jungmann
Fieseler Fi 156C Storch (built under licence at I.C.A.R.)
Focke-Wulf Fw 44 Stieglitz
Focke-Wulf Fw 58C Weihe
Focke-Wulf Fw 190 A (Captured most probably F version)
Gotha Go 242A-1
Heinkel He 111 H-3 H-6
Heinkel He 112B-2
Heinkel He 114A-2
Henschel Hs 129B2
Junkers W 34h
Junkers Ju 52/3m g7e
Junkers Ju 87D-3 Dora
Junkers Ju 87D-5 Dora
Junkers Ju 88A-4
Junkers Ju 88D-1
Klemm Kl 35D
Klemm Kl 25
Messerschmitt Me/Bf 108B Taifun
Messerschmitt Me/Bf 109E-3 E-7 (E-7 were refurbished E-3 airframes) 
Messerschmitt Me/Bf 109G-2
Messerschmitt Me/Bf 109G-4
Messerschmitt Me/Bf 109G-6
Lockheed P-38 Lightning (Captured example)
American Consolidated B-24D (Captured example)
Bloch 210 BN5
Potez 543
Potez 633 B2
Potez 63.11
Potez 65
Bristol Blenheim Mk.I
Hawker Hurricane Mk.I
Nardi FN.305
Savoia-Marchetti SM.62bis
Savoia-Marchetti SM.79B Sparviero
Savoia-Marchetti SM.79JR Sparviero
CANT Z.501 Gabbiano
Polikarpov U-2VS (Po-2) (Captured examples)
Polikarpov I-16 Type 24 (Captured examples)
MiG-3 (Captured examples)

Armoured vehicles 
AB Md. 41
Renault FT
Şeniletă Malaxa Tip UE
Șenileta Ford rusesc de captură
T-1 tractor
R-1
Renault R-35
PzKpfw 38(t)
PzKpfw III
PzKpfw IV
StuG III G
Vânătorul de care R35
TACAM T-60
TACAM R-2 
CKD Praga TH, Praga T6, T-VI-R (Praga T 6.)
Mareşal tank destroyer/Support Gun
Goliath Armoured vehicle
I.A.R. 22 - Prime Mover
PSW 222
SPW 250/1
SPW 251/1
FAMO F3 Model 1939
Gepanzerte Zugkraftwagen 8t (Sd Kfz 7)
Skoda PA-III (OA vz.27) Armoured Car
Tatra Koprivnice T-72 (OA vz.30)
CKD Praga TNSPE
Autoblindo Armored Car

Artillery 
Romanian 37 mm At Cannon
Romanian 47 mm Schneider-Concordia At Cannon
Romanian 75 mm Cannon
Hotchkiss AA-AT 25 mm single gun
Hotchkiss AA-AT 25 mm double gun
Hotchkiss AA-At 37 mm single gun
Hotchkiss AA-At 37 mm double gun

Independent State of Croatia

Aircraft
Ikarus IK-2
Rogozarski Fizir
Rogozarski PVT
Dornier Do 17E-1
Dornier Do 17K
Dornier Do 17Z-2
Fieseler Fi 156 Storch
Focke-Wulf Fw 58 Weihe
Junkers W 34h
Junkers Ju 52/3m g7e
Junkers Ju 87D (15+,some units belonged in 1.(kroat) staffeln/Stab SG.9)
Messerschmitt Me/Bf 108 Taifun
Messerschmitt Me/Bf 109E
Messerschmitt Me/Bf 109F
Messerschmitt Me/Bf 109G-2
Messerschmitt Me/Bf 109G-6
Messerschmitt Me/Bf 109G-10
Messerschmitt Me/Bf 110
Avia B-534.IV
Bloch 100
Breguet XIX B.2
Bristol Blenheim I
Hawker Hurricane Mk.I
CANT Z.1007bis Alcione
Caproni Ca.310 Libeccio
Caproni Ca.311 Libeccio
Caproni Ca.312 Libeccio
Fiat BR.20 Cicogna
Fiat G.50bis Freccia
Macchi C.202 Folgore
Macchi C.205 Veltro
SAIMAN 200
SAIMAN 202
Savoia-Marchetti SM.79K Sparviero

Armoured vehicles 
Renault FT
Tankette TK3
ADGZ Armored Car
wz.34 Armored Car
CV33/35
Panzer III ausf. N
Panzer IV ausf. F1
Panzer IV ausf. G
Panzer VI
Matilda II (Captured on eastern front)
Sd.Kfz. 251 armored half-track
Armored Train with Somua S-35 turrets.

Artillery

Bulgaria

Aircraft
Darjavna Aeroplana Rabotlinitza D.A.R.3a (LAZ-3a) (LAZ: Prefix of Prof. Lazarev, its designer)
D.A.R.6 Sinigier
D.A.R. 10F
Kazalnuk-Caproni Bulgara Societa Anonima Ka.B.3 Tchoutchouliga (Caproni Ca.113 under license)
Bulgarski Caproni KB-4
Bulgarski Caproni KB-11
Avia B-534.IV
Avia B-135
Avia B.122
Avia B 71
Aero A.304
Letov Š-328
Avia MB.200
Arado 196A-3
Dornier Do 11D
Dornier Do 17P
Dornier Do 17M
Dornier Do 17Ka-1
Fieseler Fi 156C Storch
Focke-Wulf Fw 44C Stieglitz
Focke-Wulf Fw 58 Weihe
Focke-Wulf Fw 189A-2
Heinkel He 42C-2
Heinkel He 45C
Heinkel He 46C-1
Junkers Ju 52/3m g7e
Junkers Ju 87R-2 Richard
Junkers Ju 87R-4 Richard
Junkers Ju 87D-5 Dora
Messerschmitt Me/Bf 108B Taifun
Messerschmitt Me/Bf 109E-4
Messerschmitt Me/Bf 109G-2
Messerschmitt Me/Bf 109G-4
Messerschmitt Me/Bf 109G-6
Messerschmitt Me/Bf 109G-10
Bloch 210 BN5
Dewoitine D.520
Lioret-et-Olivier LeO H-246.1
PZL P.23B Karas B
PZL P.24F

Armoured vehicles 
Carro Veloce CV 33
Vickers 6-ton tank Mk. E Alternative B
CKD T-11 (LT vz. 35)
Renault R-35
Gerat 81 Leichte Panzerspahwagen (2 cm) Sd Kfz. 222
Gerat 82 Leichte Panzerspahwagen (Fu) Sd Kfz 223
PzKpfw. IV Ausf. G
Panzerkampfwagen IV Ausf G Sd Kfz 161/1 und 161/2 (Maybach T-IV)
StuG III Ausf. G 7.5 cm Sturmgeschutz 40 Ausf G Sd Kfz 142/1 (Samochodno Oryzie 75)
PzKpfw. 38(t)
Hotchkiss H-39
Somua S-35
BMW R-12 motorcycles
AWO motorcycles
Truck Horch
Praga AV
Volkswagen Kubel
Opel Blitz
RSO
Gepanzerte Zugkraftwagen 8t (Sd Kfz 7)
Hetzer
Turan I
Semovente L40 da 47/32
105 mm StuG armor
German PzKpfw V Panther A, D, G
Steyr 640 Truck
Jagdpanzer IV

Artillery

Spain

Aircraft
Hispano-Suiza HA-132-L "Chirri"
Arado Ar 95A-1
Arado Ar 96A (opered by volunteers in Eastern Front)
Bücker Bü 131B Jungmann
Bücker Bü 133C Jungmeister
Dornier Do 16J Wal
Dornier Do 16R Super-Wal
Dornier Do 17F
Dornier Do 17P
Dornier Do 24T-3
Fieseler Fi 156 Storch
Focke-Wulf Fw 56 (used by volunteers in Eastern Front)
Focke-Wulf Fw 190 (used by volunteers in Eastern Front and Germany)
Gotha Go 145C
Heinkel He 45 (opered by volunteers in Eastern Front)
Heinkel He 46C-1
Heinkel He 51B-1
Heinkel He 59B-2
Heinkel He 60
Heinkel He 70F-2
Heinkel He 111 B,E,H
Heinkel He 112 B-0
Heinkel He 114A-2
Henschel Hs 123A-1 (included at volunteers in Eastern Front)
Henschel Hs 126A-1
Junkers Ju 87A/B (opered by Condor Legion)
Junkers Ju 52/3m g3e (also manufactured by license for CASA)
Junkers Ju 88A-4
Klemm Kl 35 (managed by volunteers in Eastern Front)
Messerschmitt Me/Bf 109D-1
Messerschmitt Me/Bf 109E (included at volunteers in Eastern Front and local use in Spain)
Messerschmitt Me/Bf 109F (included at volunteers in Eastern Front and local use in Spain)
Messerschmitt Me/Bf 109G (only operated by volunteers in Eastern Front)
CANT Z.501 Gabbiano
Fiat CR.32bis
Fiat BR.20M Cicogna
Fiat G.50 Freccia
Meridionali Ro.37bis
Meridionali Ro.43
Savoia-Marchetti SM.62
Savoia-Marchetti SM.79 Sparviero
Savoia-Marchetti SM.81 Pipistrello
Polikarpov I-15bis (I-152)
Polikarpov I-16 24 Type
Polikarpov R-5
Tupolev SB-2
Letov Š-328
Aero A.100
Boeing P-26A Model 281
Douglas DC-1
Fairchild 91 "Baby Clipper"
Grumman FF-2 (Model GE-23 "Delfin")
Northrop (Canadian Vickers) Delta Mk II
Vultee V-1A
Bleriot SPAD S.510
Bloch 210 BN5
Breguet XIX B.2
Dewoitine D.376
Dewoitine D.510
Potez 540
Airspeed A.S.Envoy III
Hawker Fury Mk.II
Hawker Osprey IV
Vickers Vildebeest IV
Fokker F.VIIb-3m
Fokker F.VII-3m/B
Fokker F.XVIII
Koolhoven F.K.51
Koolhoven F.K.52
Nieuport-Delage Ni-D.622 C1
Loire 46 C1.
Potez 540
Potez 543

Armoured vehicles 
Fiat 3000
PzKpfw IV Ausf. G
PzKpfw IV Ausf. H
StuG IIIG
Renault FT
Camion Protegido Car 1921
1921 Schneider CA-1
Hispano-Suiza Armored Truck
1923 Saint Chamond Wheel cum Track
Tank Trubia
Tank Trubia A4
Oteyza 1935 Armored Car
Verdeja (tank)
Citroën-Kegresse P16 Model 29
Vickers Carden Loyd Tankette
Bilbao Armored Car
Vickers E Type, 6 Ton Tank
1908 RMM (Rheinmetall)
Hotchkiss 1908

Artillery

See also
 German designations of foreign artillery in World War II
 German designations of foreign firearms in World War II

References

Notes

Bibliography 
Aircraft
Elke C. Weal, John A. Weal, Richard F. Barker and J.M. Bruce, Combat Aircraft of World War Two published by Arm & Armours Press, 2-6 Hampstead High Street, London NW3, 1977.

External links 

Military equipment of World War II
Military equipment on the Eastern Front
Germany allies